Vira may refer to:

Places
Vira, Ariège, a commune in the Ariège department, France
Vira (Gambarogno), a municipality in the canton of Ticino, Switzerland
Vira, Kutch, a village in Kutch district of Gujarat, India
Vira, Pyrénées-Orientales, a commune in the Pyrénées-Orientales department, France
Vira, Split-Dalmatia County, a village on Hvar Island, Croatia

Other uses
Vira, plural of "virus" in some pluralizations
Phylum vira, part of the LHT Virus classification scheme
Vira people of Central Africa
Vira (dance), a traditional dance from Portugal
Vira (card game), a Swedish three-handed plain trick game using an ordinary 52-card pack. Sometimes spelled Wira.
VirA protein, a protein histadine kinase
Vira (given name), Ukrainian female first name
LG V20